Ceralvo may refer to

 Ceralvo, Kentucky
 Ceralvo, Mexico, generally spelled Cerralvo